Karajagi  is a village in jath, in the  state of Maharashtra]], India. It is located in the jath taluk of sangli district.

Demographics
 India population census, the Karajagi village had a population of 7,708, of which 3,976 are males while 3,732 are females.<ref>{{Cite web|rate of Karajagi village was 58.97% compared to 75.36% of Karnataka. In Karajagi Male literacy stands at 68.89% while female literacy rate was 48.39%.

See also
 Gulbarga
 Districts of Karnataka

References

External links
 http://Gulbarga.nic.in/

Villages in Kalaburagi district